Rəncbər (also, Radzhibar, Randzhabar, and Randzhbar) is a village and municipality in the Hajigabul Rayon of Azerbaijan.  It has a population of 2,894.

References 

Populated places in Hajigabul District